District 14 of the Texas Senate is a senatorial district that currently serves Bastrop County and a portion of Travis county in the U.S. state of Texas.

The current Senator from District 14 is Sarah Eckhardt.

Top 5 biggest cities in district
District 14 has a population of 834,750 with 640,349 that is at voting age from the 2010 census.

District officeholders

Election history
Election history of District 14 from 1992.

2020 
The seat for District 14 became vacant on April 30, 2020, after the resignation of Kirk Watson. A special election has been called for July 14, 2020. No candidate had received over 50 percent of the vote, therefore the race was to proceed to a runoff later in 2020 between the top two candidates in the first round, resulting in two Democrats advancing to the runoff. On July 27, 2020, Eddie Rodriguez, dropped out of the race for a runoff election, resulting in Sarah Eckhardt being declared winner.

2018

2014

2010

2006

2002

2000

1996

1994

1992

Notes

References

14
Bastrop County, Texas
Travis County, Texas